Elachista velutina is a moth of the family Elachistidae that is found on the Fleurieu Peninsula in South Australia.

The forewings are pale grey while the hindwings are grey.

The larvae feed on Lepidosperma longitudinale and possibly Lepidosperma limicola. They mine the leaves of their host plant. Young larvae mine upwards, creating a straight and narrow initial stage of the mine. Later, the mine slowly widens and turns downwards. The whole mine, except the last , is filled with frass. Pupation takes place outside of the mine on a leaf of the host plant.

References

velutina
Moths described in 2011
Endemic fauna of Australia
Moths of Australia
Taxa named by Lauri Kaila